Indira Gandhi International Sports Stadium is located in Haldwani, Uttarakhand, India. It has a capacity of 25,000 people and was inaugurated on 18 December 2016 by Harish Rawat, the then Chief Minister of Uttarakhand. It is spread over an area of 70 acres and has cricket and football grounds, a track for 800-metre race, a hockey field, badminton courts, a lawn tennis court, a boxing ring, and a swimming pool.

Location 
The stadium is located on the banks of the Gaula river in the Gaulapar (Greater Haldwani) area of Haldwani.

History 
On 7 November 2014, the Government of Uttarakhand signed a Memorandum of Understanding (MoU) with NCC Limited, Hyderabad, according to which NCC Limited was to build the stadium in 18 months on 30.20 hectares of land. At that time Rs. 225 crore were allocated to this project. The foundation of Haldwani Stadium was laid on 9 November 2014 by then Chief Minister of Uttarakhand, Harish Rawat. On 18 December 2016, he inaugurated the International Cricket Ground as a part of the stadium complex. As of May 2017, the Athlete Stadium under the stadium was still under construction.

Present 
As per district Sports officer, the 80 % construction work of this stadium is finished but 20 % work is yet nor able to finish due to the lack of fund. The stadium still not open for the players and is in bad position. It was built in 176 cr rupees.

See also
 Doon School Ground
 Rajiv Gandhi International Cricket Stadium, Dehradun
 Maharana Pratap Sports College

References

External links
Stadium design

Sports venues in Uttarakhand
Cricket grounds in Uttarakhand
Monuments and memorials to Indira Gandhi
Haldwani
Sports venues completed in 2016
2016 establishments in Uttarakhand